A gubernatorial election was held on 13 March 2002 to elect the next governor of , a prefecture of Japan located in the Kansai region of Honshu island.

Candidates 

Yoshitsugu Kunimatsu, 64, incumbent since 1998, former prefectural official in charge of general affairs and health and welfare matters. He was supported by the LDP, New Komeito party and the NCP, as well as the opposition DPJ and the SDP.
Yoshihiro Tanimoto, 63, adviser to the Shiga chapter of the Zenroren, endorsed by JCP. 
Masakazu Yamanaka, 48, a former company employee.
Kingo Takada, 47, farmer.

Reference:

Results

References 

2002 elections in Japan
Shiga gubernational elections
Politics of Shiga Prefecture
July 2002 events in Japan